Barrrackpore subdivision is an administrative subdivision of the North 24 Parganas district in the Indian state of West Bengal.

History
In 1757, the East India Company obtained the zamindari or land-holders rights of the 24 Parganas Zamindari from Mir Jafar, the new Nawab of Bengal. Full proprietary status was handed over to Robert Clive in 1759 by a sanad or deed granting him the 24 Parganas as a jagir. After Clive's death in 1774, full proprietary rights of the 24 Parganas zamindari reverted to the East India Company. In 1814, the district consisted of two parts – the suburbs of Kolkata (referred to as Dihi Panchannagram) and the rest. In 1834, several parganas of Jessore and Nadia were added to the 24 Parganas. The district was divided into two divisions. The Alipore division comprised territories originally ceded to the company and the Barasat division comprised territories added from Jessore and Nadia. The two divisions were replaced by eight subdivisions in 1861 – Diamond Harbour, Baruipur, Alipore, Dum Dum, Barrackpore, Barasat, Basirhat and Satkhira. The Satkhira subdivision was transferred to the newly formed Khulna district in 1882, the Baruipur subdivision was abolished in 1883 and the Dum Dum and Barrackpore subdivisions in 1893. Barrackpore subdivision was reconstituted in 1904 with portions of Barasat and Alipore subdivisions.

Geography

Physical features
Barrackpore subdivision is part of the North Hooghly Flat, one of the three physiographic regions in the district located in the lower Ganges Delta. The country is flat. It is a little raised above flood level and the highest ground borders the river channels.

Subdivisions
North 24 Parganas district is divided into the following administrative subdivisions:

Administrative units
Barrackpore subdivision has 16 police stations, 2 community development blocks, 2 panchayat samitis, 14 gram panchayats, 64 mouzas, 53 inhabited villages, 16 municipalities, 24 census towns and 4 outgrowths. The subdivision has its headquarters at Barrackpore.

The municipalities are at Kanchrapara, Halisahar, Naihati, Bhatpara, Garulia, North Barrackpur, Barrackpore, Titagarh, Khardaha, Panihati, New Barrackpore, Kamarhati, Baranagar, Dum Dum, North Dumdum and South Dumdum.

The census towns are: Palladaha, Palashi, Nagdaha, Jetia, Balibhara, Dogachhia, Garshyamnagar, Noapara, Kaugachhi, Paltapara, Ichhapur Defence Estate, Babanpur, Jafarpur, Mohanpur, Telenipara, Chak Kanthalia, Ruiya, Patulia, Bandipur, Talbandha, Bilkanda, Muragachha, Teghari and Chandpur.

Religion
Given below is an overview of the religion-wise break-up of the population across the subdivisions of North 24 Parganas district, as per 2011 census:

North 24 Parganas district with 24.22% Muslims (in 2001) has been identified as a minority concentrated district by the Ministry of Minority Affairs, Government of India. A baseline survey on religious minority population has been carried out under the aegis of Indian Council of Social Science Research and funded by the Ministry of Minority Affairs. For information on the survey see North 24 Parganas: minority concentrated district.

Population movement
North 24 Parganas district is densely populated, mainly because of the influx of refugees from East Pakistan (later Bangladesh). With a density of population of 2,182 per km2 in 1971, it was 3rd in terms of density per km2 in West Bengal after Kolkata and Howrah, and 20th in India. According to the District Human Development Report: North 24 Parganas, "High density is also explained partly by the rapid growth of urbanization in the district. In 1991, the percentage of urban population in the district has been 51.23".

As per the Refugee Relief and Rehabilitation Department of the Government of West Bengal, the census figures show the number of refugees from East Pakistan in 1971 was nearly 6 million (60 lakhs) and in 1981, the number was assessed at 8 million (80 lakhs). A district-wise break-up in 1971, shows the main thrust of the refugee influx was on 24-Parganas (22.3% of the total refugees), Nadia (20.3%), Bankura (19.1%) and Kolkata (12.9%).

The North 24 Paraganas district has a 352 km long international border with Bangladesh, out of which 160 km is land border and 192 km is riverine border. Only a small portion of the border has been fenced and it is popularly referred to as a porous border. There are reports of Bangladeshi infiltrators. The CD Block pages carry Decadal Population Growth information.

An estimate made in 2000 places the total number of illegal Bangladeshi immigrants in India at 1.5 crore, with around 3 lakh entering every year. The thumb rule for such illegal immigrants is that for each illegal person caught four get through. While many immigrants have settled in the border areas, some have moved on, even to far way places such as Mumbai and Delhi. The border is guarded by the Border Security Force. During the UPA government, Sriprakash Jaiswal, Union Minister of State for Home Affairs, had made a statement in Parliament on 14 July 2004, that there were 12 million illegal Bangladeshi infiltrators living in India, and West Bengal topped the list with 5.7 million Bangladeshis. More recently, Kiren Rijiju, Minister of State for Home Affairs in the NDA government has put the figure at around 20 million.

Kolkata Urban Agglomeration
The following Municipalities, Census Towns and other locations in Barrackpore subdivision were part of Kolkata Urban Agglomeration in the 2011 census: Kanchrapara (M), Jetia (CT), Halisahar (M), Balibhara (CT), Naihati (M), Bhatpara (M), Kaugachhi (CT), Garshyamnagar (CT), Garulia (M), Ichhapur Defence Estate (CT), North Barrackpur (M), Barrackpur Cantonment (CB), Barrackpore (M), Jafarpur (CT), Ruiya (CT), Titagarh (M), Khardaha (M), Bandipur (CT), Panihati (M), Muragachha (CT) New Barrackpore (M), Chandpur (CT), Talbandha (CT), Patulia (CT), Kamarhati (M), Baranagar (M), South Dumdum (M), North Dumdum (M), Dum Dum (M), Noapara (CT), Babanpur (CT), Teghari (CT), Nanna (OG), Chakla (OG), Srotribati (OG) and Panpur (OG).

Police stations

Police stations in Barrackpore Police Commissionerate have the following features and jurisdiction:

Note: The police website does not mention the jurisdiction of the police stations and therefore, we are using the jurisdiction outlined in the District Statistical Handbook 2013.

Blocks
Community development blocks in Barrackpore Subdivision are:

Gram panchayats
The subdivision contains 14 gram panchayats under 2 community development blocks:

 Gram panchayats in Barrackpore I CD Block are: Jethia, Kowgachi–I, Majhipara–Palasi, Panpur–Keutia, Kampa–Chakla, Kowgachi–II, Mamudpur and Shibdaspur.
 Gram panchayats in Barrackpore II CD Block are: Bandipur, Bilkanda–II, Patulia, Bilkanda–I, Mohanpur and Sewli.

Municipal towns/ cities
An overview of the municipal towns and cities in Barrackpore subdivision is given below.

Note: The data used in this table in mainly from the District Human Development Report, based on 2001 census data, and may be at variance with the data used in municipal city/ town pages utilising≤ data from District Census Handbook 2011 or other sources. Please bear with the variance.

Education
North 24 Parganas district had a literacy rate of 84.06% (for population of 7 years and above) as per the census of India 2011. Bangaon subdivision had a literacy rate of 80.57%, Barasat Sadar subdivision 84.90%, Barrackpur subdivision 89.09%, Bidhannagar subdivision 89.16% and Basirhat subdivision 75.67%.

Given in the table below (data in numbers) is a comprehensive picture of the education scenario in North 24 Parganas district for the year 2012-13:

Note: Primary schools include junior basic schools; middle schools, high schools and higher secondary schools include madrasahs; technical schools include junior technical schools, junior government polytechnics, industrial technical institutes, industrial training centres, nursing training institutes etc.; technical and professional colleges include engineering colleges, medical colleges, para-medical institutes, management colleges, teachers training and nursing training colleges, law colleges, art colleges, music colleges etc. Special and non-formal education centres include sishu siksha kendras, madhyamik siksha kendras, centres of Rabindra mukta vidyalaya, recognised Sanskrit tols, institutions for the blind and other handicapped persons, Anganwadi centres, reformatory schools etc.

The following institutions are located in Barrackpore subdivision:

Indian Statistical Institute at Baranagar is an academic institute of national importance as recognised by a 1959 act of the Indian parliament. Established in 1931, this public university of India is focused on statistics.
Barrackpore Rastraguru Surendranath College was established at Barrackpore in 1953.
Bhairab Ganguly College was established at Belgharia in 1968.
Brahmananda Keshab Chandra College was established at Bon Hooghly in 1956.
Prasanta Chandra Mahalanobis Mahavidyalaya was established at Bon Hooghly in 1965.
Mahadevananda Mahavidyalaya was established at Manirampur in 1968.
Morning Star College, a private college and a seminary, was established at Barrackpore in 1971.
Mrinalini Datta Mahavidyapith was established at Birati in 1964.
Naba Barrackpore Prafulla Chandra Mahavidyalaya was established at New Barrackpore in 1960.
Dum Dum Motijheel College was established at Dum Dum in 1950.
Dum Dum Motijheel Rabindra Mahavidyalaya was established at Dum Dum in 1968.
Sarojini Naidu College for Women was established at Dum Dum in 1956.
Ramakrishna Sarada Mission Vivekananda Vidyabhavan was established at Dum Dum in 1961.
Hiralal Mazumdar Memorial College for Women was established at Dakshineswar in 1959.
Panihati Mahavidyalaya was established at Sodepur in 1976.
Ramakrishna Mission Vivekananda Centenary College was established at Rahara in 1963.
Rishi Bankim Chandra College was established at Naihati in 1947.
Rishi Bankim Chandra College for Women was established initially started as the morning section for women in Rishi Bankim Chandra College. The college was rechristened in 1984 as Rishi Bankim Chandra College for Women.
Rishi Bankim Chandra Evening College was set up initially as the evening section of Rishi Bankim Chandra College and was rechristened as Rishi Bankim Chandra Evening College in 1984.
Kanchrapara College was established at Kanchrapara in 1972. It is affiliated to the University of Kalyani.
P.N. Das College was established at PO Bengal Enamel, Palta in 1962.
East Calcutta Girl's College was established at Lake Town in 1992.
College of Medicine & Sagore Dutta Hospital was started at Kamarhati by the Government of West Bengal in 2010 and MBBS course was started in 2011.
St. Mary's Technical Campus Kolkata, a private engineering college, was established on Barasat-Barrackpore Road at Saibona, Nilganj in 2011.
Guru Nanak Institute of Technology, a private engineering college, was established, near Sodepur in 2003.
Narula Institute of Technology, a private engineering college, was established at Agarpara in 2001.
Elitte Institute of Engineering and Management was established at PO Karna Madhabpur in 2009. It offers diploma (3-years) courses.
Dr. Sudhir Chandra Sur Degree Engineering College, established by the JIS Educational Initiatives at Dum Dum in 2009 offers degree, diploma and post graduate courses in engineering.

See also – List of West Bengal districts ranked by literacy rate

Healthcare
The table below (all data in numbers) presents an overview of the medical facilities available and patients treated in the hospitals, health centres and sub-centres in 2013 in North 24 Parganas district.

.* Excluding nursing homes.**Subdivision-wise break up for certain items not available.

Medical facilities available in Barrackpore subdivision are as follows:

Hospitals: (Name, location, beds)
B.N.Bose Subdivisional Hospital, Barrackpore, 200 beds
Barrackpore Cantonment Hospital, Barrackpore, 48 beds
Barrackpore Police Case Hospital, Barrackpore, 6 beds
Police Brigade Hospital, Barrackpore, 120 beds
Naihati State General Hospital, Naihati, 131 beds
Lalit Mohan Maternity Home, Naihati, 11 beds
Bhatpara State General Hospital, Bhatpara, 119 beds
Matri Mangal Pratisthan, Bhatpara, 15 beds
Kanchrapara Railway Hospital, Kanchrapara, 220 beds
Shibani Arogya Niketan, Kanchrapara, 8 beds
Municipal Maternity-cun-Child Welfare Hospital, Halisahar, 10 beds
ESI Hospital, Kamarhati, 350 beds
Sagar Dutta State General Hospital, Kamarhati, 131 beds
Panihati State General Hospital, Panihati, 150 beds
Panihati Municipal Maternity Home, Panihati, 10 beds
Shree Balaram Seva Mandir, Khardaha, 100 beds
Baranagar State General Hospital, Baranagar, 100 beds
Baranagar Maternity Hospital, Baranagar, 40 beds
Dum Dum Central Jail Hospital, Dum Dum, 100 beds
Dum Dum Municipal Specialised Hospital, Dum Dum, 105 beds
North Dumdum Municipal Hospital, North Dumdum, 32 beds
South Dumdum Maternity Home, South Dumdum, 15 beds

Rural Hospitals: (Name, block, location, beds)
Nanna Rural Hospital, Malancha (via Hazinagar), 30 beds

Block Primary Health Centres: (Name, block, location, beds)
Bandipur BPHC, Bandipur, 15 beds

Primary Health Centres: (CD Block-wise)(CD Block, PHC location, beds)
Barrackpore I CD Block: Narayanpur PHC, Kakinara (via Jagatdal) (6)
Barrackpore II CD Block: Bilkanda (Teghari) PHC, Muragachha (6), Sultanpur PHC (6)

Private Medical Facilities (Name, location, speciality)
Sarada Seva Sadan, 114, Barasat Road, Barrackpore (general medicine, gynecology)
Disha Eye Hospital, 88 (63A), Ghoshpara Road, Barrackpore (ophthalmology, pediatric ophthalmology)
Disha Cataract and Refractive Surgi Centre, 130B, Ghoshpara Road, Barrackpore (ophthalmology, pediatric ophthalmology)
ILS Hospitals, Mall Road, Khudiram Bose Sarani, Dum Dum (cardiology, nephrology, general medicine, dermatology, urology etc.)

Electoral constituencies
Lok Sabha (parliamentary) and Vidhan Sabha (state assembly) constituencies in Barrackpore subdivision were as follows:

References

Barrackpore
Subdivisions in North 24 Parganas district